Aleshea Harris is an American playwright, spoken word artist, author, educator, actor, performer, and screenwriter. Her play Is God Is won the American Playwriting Foundation's Relentless Award in 2016.

Her work has been commissioned for the Denver Center for the Performing Arts. Her plays have toured in France and in Belgium and have been presented at Playfest at the Orlando Shakespeare Theater, the Edinburgh Festival Fringe, the Harriet Tubman Center for Social Justice, California Institute of the Arts, VOXfest at Dartmouth College in New Hampshire, and the Comédie de Saint-Étienne-National Drama Center in France.

Early life
Harris says that she was an army child and she lived in many places, mostly in the South.

Harris is a CalArts alumna. She was a part of CalArts' student organization - a collective that collaborated with the American Conservatory Theater in San Francisco and with the African-American Shakespeare Company, with three plays and two staged readings.

Career
Harris's work appeared in the anthology The BreakBeat Poets: New American Poetry in the Age of Hip-Hop, published in 2015.

In 2016 she shared her performance art piece What to Send Up When it Goes Down at Occidental College in Los Angeles. What to Send Up When it Goes Down incorporates song, language (spoken word), and audience participation to honor black bodies and lives. It is described as a play/pageant/ritual about the death of black people due to racial violence.

In 2017 she collaborated with The Movement Theatre Company with a reading of her play What to Send Up When It Goes Down.

In 2018, What to Send Up When It Goes Down was produced off-Broadway by The Movement Theatre Company in a Drama Desk-nominated, extended production. That production later traveled to the American Repertory Theatre in Cambridge, Woolly Mammoth Theatre Company in Washington D.C., The Public Theater in New York for the Under the Radar Festival, and will be produced at Playwrights Horizons in New York.

In 2018, a production of Is God Is, written by Harris and directed by Taibi Magar, opened at Soho Rep in New York City and ran from February 6 to March 11. Is God Is received 3 Obie Awards for Playwriting, Directing, and Performance. The play won the American Playwriting Foundation's Relentless Award in 2016. The award gave Harris the opportunity to have stage readings in regional theaters across the country and abroad.

Awards 
In addition the Relentless Award in 2016, Harris has been a two-time finalist for the Susan Smith Blackburn Prize.

In 2019, Harris received the Helen Merrill Award for playwriting.

In 2020, Harris was awarded one of the eight Windham-Campbell Literature Prizes.

Quotes
"I noted that people seemed to have a very narrow view of what kind of space my body could occupy on stage — and I found that really frustrating. I decided to write plays."

Regarding What to Send Up When It Goes Down: "It's a piece that is, ideally, a tool that communities can access when they're in crisis after someone has been killed. I feel very strongly that we need tools. Every oppressed population, every marginalized population needs tools for coping, and I hope that this can be one for black people."

References

External links
Performance, poetry and the spoken word: Aleshea Harris at TEDxCalArts

African-American dramatists and playwrights
21st-century American dramatists and playwrights
Living people
American women dramatists and playwrights
21st-century American women writers
Year of birth missing (living people)
University of Southern Mississippi alumni
California Institute of the Arts alumni
Obie Award recipients
21st-century African-American women writers
21st-century African-American writers